Drowning is a 2019 drama film written and directed by Melora Walters and starring Walters, Gil Bellows, Jay Mohr, Joanna Going, Steven Swadling, Sergio Rizzuto, and Mira Sorvino. Inspired by real life events experienced by Walters, the film recounts the story of a mother (Walters) coming to terms with her emotions as her only son (Rizzuto) is deployed to war.

Cast 
 Melora Walters as Rose
 Gil Bellows as Frank
 Jay Mohr as Henry
 Joanna Going as Catherine
 Steven Swadling as Giovanni
 Sergio Rizzuto as Charlie
 Mira Sorvino as Mary
 Christopher Backus as Peter
 Sarah Butler as Alicia
 Jim O'Heir as Tim

Production 
Filming started in Los Angeles in January 2019 and completed principal photography in 9 days.

Release 
Drowning made its world debut at the Rome Film Festival 2019 and concluded its festival run in Italy at the Marateale International Film Festival 2020, where Melora Walters took home “Best Director” and Mira Sorvino was honored with the “La Marateale International Award” for her career and her commitment to the advancement of women in film. The film was released publicly in North America on October 20, 2020, by Gravitas Ventures.

Reception
The film was reviewed by Common Sense Media and MadMass Magazine.

References

External links
 

2019 films
2019 drama films
American drama films
2010s English-language films
2010s American films